was a Japanese politician who served as the 4th Governor of Okinawa from 1978 until 1990 and mayor of Naha, the capital of Okinawa. He studied and graduated at the University of Tokyo. His son is Kosaburo Nishime a member of the House of Representatives in the Diet.

References 

1921 births
2001 deaths
Japanese politicians
People from Naha
People from Okinawa Island
Politicians from Okinawa Prefecture
Governors of Okinawa Prefecture
University of Tokyo alumni